The 2018–19 Slovenian PrvaLiga (also known as the  Prva liga Telekom Slovenije for sponsorship reasons) was the 28th edition of the Slovenian PrvaLiga since its establishment in 1991. The season began on 20 July 2018 and ended on 25 May 2019.

Competition format
Each team played 36 matches (18 home and 18 away). Teams played four matches against each other (2 home and 2 away).

Teams
A total of ten teams contested the league, including nine from the 2017–18 Slovenian PrvaLiga and one promoted from the 2017–18 Slovenian Second League.

Stadiums and locations
Seating capacity only; some stadiums also have standing areas.

Personnel and kits

League table

Results

First half of the season

Second half of the season

PrvaLiga play-off
A two-legged play-off between the ninth-placed team in the PrvaLiga and the second-placed team in the 2. SNL was played. The winner (Tabor Sežana) secured a place in the 2019–20 PrvaLiga season.

Tabor Sežana won 2–1 on aggregate.

Awards

Player of the Month

Annual awards
PrvaLiga Player of the Season
Rudi Požeg Vancaš

PrvaLiga U23 Player of the Season
Jan Mlakar

PrvaLiga Manager of the Season
Ante Šimundža

PrvaLiga Team of the Season

See also
2018–19 Slovenian Football Cup
2018–19 Slovenian Second League

References

External links
 
2018–19 PrvaLiga at Soccerway.com

Slovenian PrvaLiga seasons
Slovenia
1